Black robe, blackrobe or variant may refer to:
 Black Robes, the Jesuits (Society of Jesus)
 Black Robe, a 1985 historical novel by Brian Moore
 Black Robe (film), a 1991 historical film based on the Brian Moore novel
 The Black Robe, an 1881 epistolary novel by Wilkie Collins
 The Black Robe (film), a 1944 German film
 The Black Robe (TV series), a 1949 American television program
 Blackrobe, a book by Maurice Kenny
 Black Robe Regiment

See also
 Black coat (disambiguation)
 Black (disambiguation)
 Robe (disambiguation)
 Cassocks, religious clothing, usually black for Catholic priests